Ihlara, formerly known as Chliára (Cappadocian Greek: Χλιάρα; Latin: Chliará) is a town (belde) and municipality in the Güzelyurt District, Aksaray Province, Turkey. Its population is 2,289 (2021). The Melendiz River flows through the valley.

The Ihlara valley consists of 14 km along the north-south Melendiz River, which runs from Selime to Ihlara village. Sixteen of the valley's 105 churches are open to visitors, and most of these are within 1 km of the official valley entrance in Ihlara. The first one you are likely to see is Ağaçaltı Kilise (Church Under the Trees), at the base of the stairs leading into the valley. Spectacular blue and white angels encircle the Christ figure on the well-preserved dome. Another 30m south past the Ağaçaltı (to the right after descending the entrance stairs, away from Belisirma) lies the Ptirenllseki Church, whose faded walls enclose the many martyrs of Sivas. The Kokar Kilise (Odorous Church), 70m farther along, celebrates biblical stories with colorful frescoes and ornate geometrical ceiling crosses.

What makes the valley unique is the ancient history of its inhabitants. The whole canyon is honeycombed with rock-cut underground dwellings and churches from the Byzantine period built by the Cappadocian Greeks. These local people were forced to leave the area and move to Greece in the 1923 Population exchange between Turkey and Greece.

Etymology 
The town of Ihlara had formerly been known as Chlorus or Chlorós (Ancient Greek: Χλωρός) during the Roman and Byzantine period. This name was later rendered as Chliara (Cappadocian Greek: Χλιάρα; Latin: Chliará), which later got mutated to Ichlara, and then to its present name, Ihlara.

Features
It is 40 km from Aksaray.

Ihlara Valley is a canyon valley formed as a result of stream erosion by lava sprayed from Hasandağı volcano. Melendiz Stream, at the end of a process of millions of years, created this canyon-like valley that is 14 kilometers long and reaches 110 meters in height. The Melendiz Stream, which led the canyon through these cracks to take its current form, was called "Potamus Kapadukus", which means Cappadocia River in ancient times.

The 14 km long valley starts from Ihlara and ends in Selime. Melendiz Stream meanders through the canyon. The length of the stream, which makes more than 26 meanders between Ihlara and Selime, is 8 km, but in reality it reaches 13 km. The height of the valley is 100 –150 m in places. There are countless shelters, tombs and churches carved into the rocks throughout the valley. The decorations in the churches in the Ihlara Valley started in the 6th century and continued until the end of the 13th century.

Some shelters and churches are connected by tunnels, as in underground cities.

Churches
Due to the valley's plentiful supply of water and hidden places, this was the first settlement of the first Christians escaping from Roman soldiers. In the Ihlara Valley there are hundreds of old churches in the volcanic rock caves. The best-known churches are Ağaçaltı Church with cross plan, Sümbüllü Church, Pürenliseki Church, Kokar Church, Yilanli Church, Karagedik Church, Kirkdamatli Church, Direkli Church, Ala Church, Kemerli Church and Egritas Church.

Churches located along the valley can be divided into two groups:

The murals of the churches close to Ihlara have an eastern influence, far from the Cappadocian art.

The areas near Belisirma are decorated with Byzantine type wall paintings.

The number of inscriptions known from the Byzantine Period in the Ihlara Region is quite low.

The Seljuk Sultan II. Mesud (1282 -1305) and Byzantine emperor II. There is an inscription on a 13th century fresco containing the names of Andronikos.

This inscription proves the existence of the tolerant administration of the Seljuks, who held the region in their hands. Among the churches whose history has been determined:

Pillared Church (976-1025)
Pürenli Seki Church belongs to the beginning of the 10th century and the 12th century.
It belongs to the years of Saint Georges (1283-1295).
The Dark Castle Church is dated to the 10th-11th centuries.
In the middle of the 10th century, new churches were built in the Ihlara region after the Byzantines recaptured the Taurus and Cilicia regions.

Bahaeddin Samanlığı Church
Hyacinth Church
Mast Church
Examples of Byzantine art in the early 11th century:

Ala Church
Canli Church (Akhisar)
Karagedik Church
Some Byzantine type paintings were added to the old churches later on.

This behavior ends with the arrival of the Seljuk Turks in the 11th century.

But the religious life in the region continues. The church life in the region ends with the population exchange in 1924.

Religious Life
Due to its geomorphological features, the Ihlara valley has been a suitable retreat and place of worship for monks and priests.

Aksaray has been an important religious center in the early years of Christianity.

Sect founders such as Basilus of Kayseri and Gregorius of Nazianzos were born in the 4th century. They were also raised here.

They determined the rules of a monastic life separate from the Egyptian and Syrian system.

Thus, the Greek and Slavic system was born.

Although the Egyptian and Syrian priests cut off their relations with the world, the priests of Basilus and Gregorius did not cut off their relations with the world. The place of this new understanding was Belisirma.

Gregorius put forward ideas that strengthened the views of the Nicaean meeting in the discussion of the deity of Jesus by bringing a new explanation to the belief in the trinity. Thus, he became a leading saint in the history of Christianity. The rocky region where Gregorius grew up (Belisırma, Ihlara, Güzelyurt (Gelveri)) became a group of churches carved into the rocks, in line with the monastery spirit.

When the defensive fortresses in Hasandağı resisted the Arab raids, these churches continued to be active centers of worship.

References

External links 
 Ihlara
 Aksaray governorship (er)
 dictionary.

Cappadocia
Towns in Turkey
Populated places in Güzelyurt District, Aksaray